, better known exclusively by his stage name Inoran, is a Japanese musician, singer and songwriter. He is best known as the rhythm guitarist and co-founder of the rock band Luna Sea since 1986. He started his solo career in 1997. Luna Sea disbanded in 2000, and he formed Fake? with Oblivion Dust vocalist Ken Lloyd a year later. In 2005 he left Fake? and founded Tourbillon with Luna Sea vocalist Ryuichi Kawamura and Hiroaki Hayama. He rejoined Luna Sea when they reunited in 2010, and in 2012 formed Muddy Apes with bassist Taka Hirose and guitarist Dean Tidey, both from Feeder, and 8otto's vocalist Maeson.

Career
In middle school through high school, Inoran became good friends with J, and they formed a band called Lunacy in 1986. In 1991, they changed their name to Luna Sea and released their first album. They went on to become very successful, having sold more than 10 million certified units in Japan, and are considered one of the most influential bands in the visual kei movement.

In 1993, Inoran and J teamed up with X Japan guitarist hide to form the group M*A*S*S. Their only material released was the song "Frozen Bug" on the sampler Dance 2 Noise 004 (the song would later be remixed by hide and put on his debut solo album Hide Your Face).

On September 25, 1997, Inoran released his first solo material, the single "Sou" on King Records. The following month his debut album, also titled Sou, was released on October 22. Inoran does not sing on the album (except the title track), instead it features several different female vocalists.

When Luna Sea "drew the curtain" in 2000, Inoran started Fake? in late 2001 with former Oblivion Dust vocalist Ken Lloyd. When he left Fake? in October 2005, citing musical differences with Ken Lloyd, he founded Tourbillon with former Luna Sea vocalist Ryuichi Kawamura and Hiroaki Hayama.

In the summer of 2006, he began his solo career again and released the album Photograph. After releasing the album Nirai Kanai in July 2007, he performed many live concerts and released the concert DVD Tour 2007 Determine along with The Best album, which covers his favorite music selected by himself and his fan-club. The album also features the new song "I Swear". On December 24, 2007, Inoran reunited with Luna Sea to play a one-night concert in front of an audience of around 45,000 people at the Tokyo Dome. One more reunion would happen again at the hide memorial summit on May 4, 2008.

In March 2008, Inoran released his first official book Monophonic. Inoran performed overseas for the first time in July in Taiwan and South Korea (for the Formoz Festival 2008 and Incheon Pentaport Rock Festival 2008, respectively). On September 21, he performed at D'erlanger's Abstinence's Door #002 event, along with Merry and heidi. His fifth original album Apocalypse was released on September 24. The tour for the album, entitled Butterfly Effect, incorporated an international extension to perform overseas again, this time in Hong Kong in November, before the tour finale back in Japan. He released his first instrumental album Shadow on December 24; it includes the title track for the movie A Symmetry.

Inoran performed on October 25 as part of the two-day V-Rock Festival '09.

In May 2010, Inoran and Orange Range guitarist Naoto created and released the song "Love For..." for the victims of the 2010 Haiti earthquake. In August, he appeared with the other members of Luna Sea at a press conference in Hong Kong, where they officially announced their reunion and their 20th Anniversary World Tour Reboot -to the New Moon-. On September 19, Inoran joined British rock band Feeder on stage at the Tokyo Unit for a cover version performance of the Nirvana track "Breed". Feeder's bass player Taka Hirose played on Inoran's next single, "Hide and Seek".

Inoran released the album Teardrop on March 30, 2011 and went on tour in support of it. In April the song "Love For...", which he and Orange Range guitarist Naoto created in 2010 for the Haiti earthquake, was offered for download once again. This time with the proceeds donated to aid reconstruction of the area damaged by the 2011 Tōhoku earthquake and tsunami. On September 21, his first album Sou was re-released with a new version of the title track, the bonus track "The Agenda", which was a B-side on his debut single and features American hip-hop artist Black Thought, and a DVD of the promotional video for "Sou".

In June 2012, Inoran teamed up with Taka Hirose once again, as well as Feeder's support guitarist Dean Tidey and 8otto's vocalist Maeson, to form the band Muddy Apes. Their debut album, Crush It, was released in Japan by King Records and digitally in Europe by Bishi Bishi on September 5. Inoran's album Dive Youth, Sonik Dive was released on June 27, 2012 and includes "Lemontune", a song originally by Fake?. Anna Tsuchiya provides additional vocals on the song "No Options", the limited edition of the album comes with a DVD and a 12-inch vinyl record with "No Options - Mirrorless", a version of the song which Inoran sings himself. It was supported with a nationwide Japanese tour that also celebrated his 15th anniversary as a solo artist. On August 31 in Stockholm, he kicked off his first European tour, Seven Samurais, which took him to Vienna, Cologne, Hamburg, Venice, Milan and ended on September 16 in Paris.

Inoran returned to the stage with Ken Lloyd and Fake? on February 23, 2013, for the concert Fake? -Live Decade-, his first performance with him since he left the group in 2005. On August 16, Inoran performed at Angelo's "Intersection of Dogma" event, alongside other acts such as heidi., lynch. and Mucc.

He released his next studio album, Beautiful Now, on August 26, 2015. It includes a cover of hide's "Pink Spider" and was followed by a nationwide tour in September.

In 2017 he teamed up with Teru, Hisashi, Pierre Nakano (Ling tosite Sigure) and Ery (Raglaia) to cover "Lullaby" by D'erlanger for the D'erlanger Tribute Album ~Stairway to Heaven~.

Personal life
Inoran has two younger brothers. He loved playing baseball when he was in school. The nickname Inoran came into existence when he was playing a baseball game; he hit the ball and a fan kept shouting "Ino! Run!!", which sounded like "Inoran". He was also said to be popular among girls in his school. Because of his good manner and looks, Tokyo Pop contacted him to be an idol but Inoran refused.

At age 16, Inoran became a big fan of Cipher, the guitarist and co-founder of the band D'erlanger, when he went to see one of their live concerts. Inoran said in an interview that Cipher is a person who has changed his life. Though Inoran is left-handed, he said he's more comfortable playing guitar with his right hand. He is also claustrophobic, this inspired him to compose the song "Claustrophobia", the B-side of Luna Sea's first single "Believe".

Equipment
In 2010, Inoran endorsed the American-based guitar brand Fender. Inoran (together with ken from L'Arc-en-Ciel) was approached by Fender and signed the endorsement contract; his signature model is based on a 1959 Jazzmaster. The black "Inoran Jazzmaster #1 LTD" was released in 2011 and the aged Olympic White #2 model in 2013. Another aged Olympic White model, "Inoran Road Worn Jazzmaster", was released in 2015.

Inoran was previously endorsed by ESP Guitars and had around eight signature models with them. He has also been known to occasionally use Stratocasters, Jaguars, Gibson Les Pauls, and ES-335s.

Discography

Albums
 , Oricon Albums Chart Peak Position: #16, #117 (reissue)
 Fragment (July 25, 2001) #16
 Photograph (September 26, 2006) #42
  #43
 Apocalypse (September 24, 2008) #37
 Watercolor (March 10, 2010) #40
 Teardrop (March 30, 2011) #25
 Dive Youth, Sonik Dive (June 27, 2012) #38
 Somewhere (March 19, 2014, mini-album) #47
 Beautiful Now (August 26, 2015) #22
 Thank You (August 24, 2016) #27
 2019 (August 7, 2019) #31
 Libertine Dreams (September 30, 2020) #36
 Between the World and Me (February 17, 2021) #40
 Any Day Now (October 20, 2021) #44

Remix albums
 Landscape of Fragment (November 21, 2001; CD, December 25, 2001; 12″ vinyl) #79 (CD)

Other albums
 The Best (January 23, 2008; compilation) #40
 Shadow (December 24, 2008; instrumental) #123
 Intense / Mellow (August 23, 2017; self-cover) #32
 In My Oasis Billboard Session (June 29, 2022; live album) #44

Singles
 , Oricon Singles Chart Peak Position: #7
 "Won't Leave My Mind" (June 13, 2001) #15
 "Waves/Felicidad" (January 1, 2004; fan club limited)
 "/Elements of Foundation" (September 17, 2009)
Inoran×Roen collaboration, limited CD and DVD release available at Inoran Live Tour 2009.
 "Hide and Seek" (October 5, 2011) #10
 "Something About You" (September 13, 2013, concert limited)

Home videos
 Won't Leave My Mind (August 8, 2001), Oricon DVDs Chart Peak Position: #19
 The Last Night (June 25, 2003) #90
 Another Room (April 26, 2005)
 Raize (September 26, 2006)
 Tour 2006 Photograph (March 7, 2007) #78
 Tour 2007 Determine (January 23, 2008) #62
 2008 Butterfly Effect+ (June 10, 2009) #27
 Tour 2010 Watercolor (September 22, 2010) #73
 I'm Here (August 28, 2013) #48
 Tour 2015 -Beautiful Now- at EX Theater Roppongi (April 6, 2016) #21
 Sugizo vs Inoran Presents Best Bout ~L 2/5~ (April 26, 2017) #33
 Override (August 22, 2018) #26
 Inoran Tour 2019 Cowboy Puni-Shit Live in Tokyo (February 26, 2020), Oricon Blu-rays Chart Peak Position: #72
 Sugizo vs Inoran Presents Best Bout 2021 ~L 2/5~ (March 9, 2022) #38
 Inoran -Tokyo 5 Nights- Back to the Rock'N Roll (March 9, 2022) #45
 In My Oasis Billboard Session (December 14, 2022)

Books
 Monophonic (March 2008)

With Luna Sea

With Muddy Apes
 Crush It (2012)
 Fairy Dirt Nº5 (2013)
 Faraway So Close (2016)

Other work
 OLIVIA; "Sailing Free" (2009) - arranger on track 1
 Ever; Happiness Is... (2009) - composer, arranger, producer on track 1
 lynch.; Inferiority Complex (2012) - guitar on "Experience"
 lecca; lecca Live 2012 Jammin' the Empire @ Nippon Budokan (2009) - "Missing Ordinary", "Higher"
 Oldcodex; Oldcodex Live DVD "Contrast Silver" Tour Final (2013) - "Heaven"
 Ryuichi Kawamura; Beautiful Lie (2021) - composer, co-arranger on "Sing to You"

References

External links
 Official website
 Official blog

1970 births
Living people
Luna Sea members
Visual kei musicians
Musicians from Kanagawa Prefecture
King Records (Japan) artists
Japanese male singer-songwriters
Japanese singer-songwriters
Japanese male rock singers
Japanese rock guitarists
Japanese alternative rock musicians
Rhythm guitarists
People from Hadano, Kanagawa
20th-century Japanese guitarists
21st-century Japanese guitarists